Marios Andreou (born 26 August 1998) is a Cypriot footballer who plays as a midfielder. He currently plays for Portland Timbers U23s.

Club career
Andreou made his senior debut for Apollon against Karmiotissa in February 2017, coming on as a substitute for Alex da Silva in a 3–0 victory.

Career statistics

Club

Notes

References

External links
 Marios Andreou at UEFA
 Marios Andreou at the Grand Canyon University

1998 births
Living people
Grand Canyon University alumni
Cypriot footballers
Cyprus youth international footballers
Association football midfielders
Cypriot First Division players
USL League Two players
Apollon Limassol FC players
Grand Canyon Antelopes men's soccer players
Portland Timbers U23s players
Cypriot expatriate footballers
Expatriate soccer players in the United States